Gasoline is a ghost town in Briscoe County, Texas.

A post office called Gasoline was established in 1907, and remained in operation until 1948. The community was named after a gasoline-powered cotton gin near the original town site.

References

Ghost towns in Texas
Landforms of Briscoe County, Texas